The Canaanite Gate of ancient Tell is a monument located in downtown Beirut, Lebanon.

Overview
A gate and an L-shaped passage (circa 1500 BC) were discovered during the mid-1990s excavations. They led to a fortified enclosure around the temple and the palace of Canaanite Biruta (Beirut).

Construction
Around 1500 BC, Biruta was a fortified city; entering a fortified enclosure that surrounded the temple and palace conveyed order, power and prosperity. The visitor had to pass through a gate and a narrow passage. The L-shaped form of the passage had defensive and ceremonial origins.

History
Around 1500 BC, the city wall and its gates conveyed order, power and prosperity in Canaanite Biruta. To enter a fortified enclosure that surrounded the temple and palace, the visitor had to pass through a gate and narrow passage. The L-shaped form of the passage had both defensive and ceremonial origins. In times of war, when the city was under siege, the angle of the passageway prevented invaders from hoisting a battering ram to destroy the gate.  In times of peace, a visitor was not afforded direct access to the temple or the palace, but had to make a turn in the passageway. The latter opened onto a monumental stairway, which led to the place of authority.

Timeline
1500 BC: The city wall and its gates conveyed order, power and prosperity in Canaanite Biruta.

See also
 Ancient Tell

References 
Badre, Leila (1998) “BEY 003 Preliminary Report, Excavations of the American University of Beirut Museum, 1993–96”, Bulletin d’ Archéologie et d’ Architecture Libanaises 2: 6–94. 

Monuments and memorials in Lebanon
Tourist attractions in Beirut